Akeem Chambers (born 16 June 1998) is a Jamaican footballer who plays for National Premier League side Waterhouse and the Jamaica national team.

Career

Club 
Chambers plays for Waterhouse FC in Jamaica and also studies at Mico Teachers College

International
Chambers made his senior debut for Jamaica against Guyana in their final 2019-20 CONCACAF Nations League match on 19 November 2019.

Personal life
In April 2020, Chambers' home in Kingston was destroyed in a fire.

References

External links

1998 births
Living people
Jamaican footballers
Association football goalkeepers
Jamaica international footballers
Waterhouse F.C. players